Nic Jones is an album by Nic Jones, released in 1971.

Track listing
"The Lass Of London City" 2:08
"Napoleon's Lamentation" 2:53
"The Bonny Bunch Of Roses" 6:05
"Edward" 3:29
"The Outlandish Knight" 3:35
"William And Nancy's Parting" 2:13
"Lord Bateman" 7:09
"Dance To Your Daddy" 1:29
"The Two Brothers" 3:52
"The Banks Of Green Willow" 2:51

References

1971 albums
Nic Jones albums